Colonia Narvarte is the commonly used name for an area in the Benito Juárez borough of Mexico City.

Geography
The area commonly known as Narvarte or Colonia Narvarte actually contains five officially recognized neighborhoods:
Colonia Piedad Narvarte
Colonia Atenor Salas
Colonia Narvarte Poniente
Colonia Narvarte Oriente
Colonia Vértiz Narvarte

Narvarte is bordered on the west by Colonia del Valle, the north by Viaducto Miguel Alemán freeway, across which are Colonia Roma Sur, Colonia Buenos Aires and Colonia Doctores.

History
The old village of La Piedad was located in Colonia Piedad Narvarte, but no traces remain.  The area was developed starting in the 1940s, and Japanese, German and Lebanese immigrants moved here.

Points of interest
The large Parque Delta shopping center is located in Colonia Piedad Narvarte. The headquarters of the Secretariat of Communications and Transportation with its famous murals is also located in the area.

Transportation
The area is served by metro stations Metro Eugenia, Metro Etiopia and Metro División del Norte and by Mexico City Metrobús lines 2 and 3.

References

Colonia Narvarte
Narvarte